Crematogaster brevis is a species of ant in tribe Crematogastrini. It was described by Emery in 1887.

References

brevis
Insects described in 1887